Sir Henry Normand MacLaurin, (known as Normand MacLaurin; 10 December 1835 in Kilconquhar, Scotland – 24 August 1914 in Sydney, Australia), was a Scottish-born physician, company director, Australian politician and university administrator.

Biography
MacLaurin was born in Kilconquhar, Fife, Scotland, the son of James MacLaurin, M.A. schoolmaster and Catherine, née Brearcliffe. He was educated at home. At 15 years of age he won a bursary at the University of St Andrews and took the degree of M.A., graduating in 1854 at 19 years of age.

Both parents died before he was 19. With help from his only brother, Rev. James MacLaurin, and some fees he earned for tutoring, he enrolled in medicine at the University of Edinburgh. He qualified as M.D. in 1857 (aged 22) and subsequently served on eight different ships in the Royal Navy.

In the course of his naval service, on 4 February 1868 he reached Port Phillip, and then Sydney in conjunction with the Royal Visit to Australia of Alfred, Duke of Edinburgh. On 1 October 1868 he decided to register with the Medical Board of New South Wales, where he met Dr Charles Nathan and his family. He was obliged to return with his ship to England, but in May 1871 he obtained 12 months leave and returned to Sydney where he married Eliza Ann née Nathan at St James' Church on 6 October 1871. (Eliza Nathan was the daughter of Charles, and the granddaughter of Isaac Nathan.) He was dropped from the navy list in January 1873.

MacLaurin went to Parramatta, and then after his father-in-law's death in September 1872, to Macquarie Street, Sydney. and became good friends with Charles Mackellar.

MacLaurin became a member of the Legislative Council of New South Wales in 1889. In April 1893 he became vice-president of the executive council in the George Dibbs ministry. Soon after, there was a financial crisis. MacLaurin suggested to the premier that all bank notes should be made legal tender; this suggestion was adopted and helped very much to allay the panic.

In 1887 MacLaurin was appointed vice-chancellor of the University of Sydney, becoming chancellor in 1896. He was made a knight bachelor on 15 August 1902, after the honour had been announced in the 1902 Coronation Honours list published on 26 June 1902.

See also
MacLaurin had 4 sons:
 Charles MacLaurin (1872–1925), M.B., B.S., F.R.C.S. was "a medical practitioner" who wrote a number of notable publications.
 Henry Normand MacLaurin (1878–1915), was a barrister and Brigadier General who was killed at the Battle of Gallipoli in 1915.
 J.B. MacLaurin
 H.C.H. MacLaurin

References

 

1835 births
1914 deaths
Members of the New South Wales Legislative Assembly
Scottish emigrants to Australia
People from Kilconquhar
Alumni of the University of St Andrews
Alumni of the University of Edinburgh
Knights Bachelor
Royal Navy officers
19th-century Scottish medical doctors